Begumganj is a town and a municipality in Raisen district  in the state of Madhya Pradesh, India. and is located on the Bhopal - Sagar National Highway (NH-86 A) 120  km away from Bhopal. It is one of the five divisions of the Raisen district.

Geography
It has an average elevation of 498 metres (1633 feet). It is located on the river Bina. It is about 120  km north of Bhopal, the capital of the Central Indian State of Madhya Pradesh, and is about 85 km from Raisen town, which is the district headquarters. It is much easier to reach Begumganj from Bhopal. On account of better roads and more frequent buses plying between Bhopal and Begumganj.
It takes about 2.5 hours by a public transport bus to reach Begumganj from Bhopal, connected with fine state highway no.21. These buses are available 24 Hours from ISBT (Inter State Bus Terminal, Hoshangabad Road) stand of Bhopal. The nearest railway station is Sagar, 60 kilometers east of Begumganj.

Demographics

As of the 2011 Census of India, Begumganj had a population of 34,031. Males constitute 52% of the population and females 48%. Begumganj has an average literacy rate of 72%, higher than the national average of 72.5%; with 58% of the males and 42% of females literate. 17% of the population is under 6 years of age. Begumganj has a mixed population of 
Hindus and Muslims. in the town, the Hindus and Muslims are almost in equal numbers.

Transport 
The nearest airport is Bhopal.

References

Cities and towns in Raisen district
Raisen